Krásná Hora nad Vltavou is a town in Příbram District in the Central Bohemian Region of the Czech Republic. It has about 1,100 inhabitants.

Administrative parts
Villages of Hostovnice, Krašovice, Mokřice, Plešiště, Podmoky, Švastalova Lhota, Tisovnice, Vletice, Vrbice and Zhoř are administrative parts of Krásná Hora nad Vltavou.

Etymology
The name Krásná Hora means literally "beautiful mountain". The name arose due to the mining activity, when gold and later antimony were mined here. The adjective nad Vltavou ("above the Vltava") was added in 1907 to distinguish it from places with the same name.

Geography
It lies in the Benešov Uplands. The Brzina Stream flows through the municipal territory. In the west, the municipal border is formed by the Kamýk Reservoir, built on the Vltava River.

History
The first written mention of Krásná Hora is from 1341, when it was listed among the mining settlements. Gold was first panned here and then mined together with antimony. Krásná Hora received various privileges from the Czech kings and became a royal town. It lost this title in 1554, which also meant the loss of privileges and gradual decline. The decline was completed by the Thirty Years' War, when mining came to an end.

The town then often changed owners. Mining of antimony was first revived briefly between 1700 and 1712, and then to a greater extent during the 19th century. The mines reached their peak in 1881, when 700 miners were employed there.

Demographics

Sights
The landmarks of Krásná Hora nad Vltavouare the town hall and Church of Saint Nicholas. The church was first documented in 1350. The original Gothic church collapsed in 1839 and was replaced by a new one, built in 1850–1855.

In the village of Plešiště is a building called Holanova Turyně. It was a medieval fortress, which was baroque rebuilt and then further modified in the 19th century. It is a cultural monument.

References

External links

Populated places in Příbram District
Cities and towns in the Czech Republic